Johann Michael Rottmayr (11 December 1656 – 25 October 1730) was an Austrian painter.

Biography 
Rottmayr was born in Laufen an der Salzach, Bavaria. Along with his Laufen-born contemporary, Hans Adam Weissenkircher, he received his education from Johann Carl Loth in Venice. Just as Weissenkircher had brought the Italian Renaissance to the Southern Alps and the court of the Princes of Eggenberg in Graz, Rottmayr brought it north of the Alps. From 1689 onwards, he worked in Salzburg, and was employed as the general painter of the Prince-Bishop of Salzburg.

Gallery

See also

Johann Michael Rottmayr painted the inside of the central dome of the Melk Abbey.  This particular painting was recently selected as the main motif of a very high-value collectors' coin: the Austrian Melk Abbey commemorative coin, minted on April 18, 2007. The reverse side gives a view up into the central dome of the church, with its typical vision of heaven.

External links

Born between Salzburg and Braunau am Inn

1656 births
1730 deaths
17th-century Austrian painters
Austrian male painters
18th-century Austrian painters
18th-century Austrian male artists
Baroque painters
People from Berchtesgadener Land
Austrian Roman Catholics